This is a list of binomial names in the fungi genus Phyllachora (in the family of Phyllachoraceae), with just accepted species and not including synonyms. (See Species Fungorum for former species)

Outline of Fungi and fungus-like taxa lists up to 1513 species (in 2020).
1384 records are listed by Species Fungorum, (but this also includes former species).

A

Phyllachora aberiae 
Phyllachora abortiva 
Phyllachora abri 
Phyllachora abutilonis 
Phyllachora abyssinica 
Phyllachora acaciae 
Phyllachora acaenae 
Phyllachora accedens 
Phyllachora acervulata 
Phyllachora actinodaphnes 
Phyllachora acutispora 
Phyllachora adolphiae 
Phyllachora advena 
Phyllachora aegiphilae 
Phyllachora aegopodii 
Phyllachora afra 
Phyllachora africana 
Phyllachora afzeliae 
Phyllachora agharkarii 
Phyllachora ajrekarii 
Phyllachora alamoi 
Phyllachora aliena 
Phyllachora alnicola 
Phyllachora aloetica 
Phyllachora alpiniae 
Phyllachora alyxiae 
Phyllachora amaniensis 
Phyllachora amazonensis 
Phyllachora ambigua 
Phyllachora americana 
Phyllachora amica 
Phyllachora amphibola 
Phyllachora amphidyma 
Phyllachora amphigena 
Phyllachora amplexicaulis 
Phyllachora amyridicola 
Phyllachora amyridis 
Phyllachora anacardiarum 
Phyllachora anceps 
Phyllachora andamanica 
Phyllachora andicola 
Phyllachora andropogonis 
Phyllachora angelicae 
Phyllachora angustispora 
Phyllachora annonaceae 
Phyllachora annonicola 
Phyllachora annulata 
Phyllachora annuliformis 
Phyllachora anomala 
Phyllachora antarctica 
Phyllachora anthephorae 
Phyllachora anthistiriae 
Phyllachora apiahyna 
Phyllachora apoensis 
Phyllachora applanata 
Phyllachora araliae 
Phyllachora araliarum 
Phyllachora aravalliensis 
Phyllachora ardisiae 
Phyllachora arechavaletae 
Phyllachora aristidae 
Phyllachora arthraxonis 
Phyllachora asclepiadis 
Phyllachora aspidea 
Phyllachora aspideoides 
Phyllachora asterigena 
Phyllachora asteromorpha 
Phyllachora astronii 
Phyllachora ateleiae 
Phyllachora atrofigurans 
Phyllachora atroinquinans 
Phyllachora atromaculans

B

Phyllachora bakeriana 
Phyllachora balakrishnanii 
Phyllachora baldensis 
Phyllachora bambusae 
Phyllachora bambusina 
Phyllachora banahaensis 
Phyllachora banisteriae 
Phyllachora banksiae 
Phyllachora baphispora 
Phyllachora barnadesiae 
Phyllachora barringtoniae 
Phyllachora barringtoniicola 
Phyllachora bauhiniae 
Phyllachora baumii 
Phyllachora beaumontii 
Phyllachora begoniae 
Phyllachora bella 
Phyllachora betulae-nanae 
Phyllachora biareolata 
Phyllachora biguttulata 
Phyllachora bischofiae 
Phyllachora blanquillo 
Phyllachora blepharoneuri 
Phyllachora bogotensis 
Phyllachora bontocensis 
Phyllachora bourreriae 
Phyllachora brachyspora 
Phyllachora brachystegiae 
Phyllachora brachystemonis 
Phyllachora brasiliensis 
Phyllachora brenesii 
Phyllachora brittoniana 
Phyllachora bromi 
Phyllachora brosimi 
Phyllachora buchenaviae 
Phyllachora buddlejae 
Phyllachora bulbosa 
Phyllachora bullulata 
Phyllachora burgessiae 
Phyllachora butleri 
Phyllachora byttneriae

C

Phyllachora caesalpiniae 
Phyllachora caffra 
Phyllachora calamagrostidis 
Phyllachora calami 
Phyllachora callistemonis 
Phyllachora calycophylli 
Phyllachora canavaliae 
Phyllachora cannabis 
Phyllachora cantonensis 
Phyllachora capensis 
Phyllachora capparis 
Phyllachora caricis-jaluensis 
Phyllachora carnea 
Phyllachora carpodini 
Phyllachora caseariae 
Phyllachora casimiroae 
Phyllachora cassiae 
Phyllachora castaneae 
Phyllachora catervaria 
Phyllachora catesbyana 
Phyllachora cayennensis 
Phyllachora cecropiae 
Phyllachora celastri 
Phyllachora centothecae 
Phyllachora cepae 
Phyllachora chalybaea 
Phyllachora chenopodii 
Phyllachora chimonobambusae 
Phyllachora chloridis 
Phyllachora chrysopogonicola 
Phyllachora chusqueae 
Phyllachora chusqueana 
Phyllachora cibotii 
Phyllachora ciferrii 
Phyllachora cinerascens 
Phyllachora cinerea 
Phyllachora cinnae 
Phyllachora cinnamomi 
Phyllachora circinans 
Phyllachora citharexyli 
Phyllachora cladii-glomerati 
Phyllachora clavata 
Phyllachora clibadii 
Phyllachora clusiae 
Phyllachora clypeata 
Phyllachora coccolobae 
Phyllachora coicis 
Phyllachora columbiensis 
Phyllachora compositae 
Phyllachora concentrica 
Phyllachora concinna 
Phyllachora condigna 
Phyllachora conferta 
Phyllachora congregata 
Phyllachora conica 
Phyllachora connari 
Phyllachora connarina 
Phyllachora consociata 
Phyllachora conspicua 
Phyllachora conspurcata 
Phyllachora contigua 
Phyllachora coorgiana 
Phyllachora copaiferae 
Phyllachora copeyensis 
Phyllachora corallina 
Phyllachora costaericae 
Phyllachora costaricensis 
Phyllachora coutoubeae 
Phyllachora crotonicola 
Phyllachora crotonis 
Phyllachora crustacea 
Phyllachora cucurbitacearum 
Phyllachora culmicola 
Phyllachora curvulispora 
Phyllachora cymbispora 
Phyllachora cynodonticola 
Phyllachora cynodontis 
Phyllachora cyperi 
Phyllachora cyperina

D

Phyllachora dactylidis 
Phyllachora dalibardae 
Phyllachora dallasensis 
Phyllachora danthoniae 
Phyllachora davillae 
Phyllachora dawei 
Phyllachora decaisneana 
Phyllachora delicatula 
Phyllachora demersa 
Phyllachora deminuta 
Phyllachora dendritica 
Phyllachora denigrans 
Phyllachora derridicola 
Phyllachora detecta 
Phyllachora deusta 
Phyllachora deviata 
Phyllachora devriesii 
Phyllachora didyma 
Phyllachora diehlii 
Phyllachora digitariicola 
Phyllachora dimeriae 
Phyllachora dimorphocalycicola 
Phyllachora diocleicola 
Phyllachora dioscoreae 
Phyllachora diospyri 
Phyllachora dischidiae 
Phyllachora dispar 
Phyllachora dispersa 
Phyllachora disseminata 
Phyllachora distinguenda 
Phyllachora dolgei 
Phyllachora dolichogena 
Phyllachora dolichospora 
Phyllachora dombeyae 
Phyllachora domingensis 
Phyllachora dominicana 
Phyllachora dothideoides 
Phyllachora drypeticola 
Phyllachora dubia 
Phyllachora duplex 
Phyllachora durantae

E

Phyllachora effigurata 
Phyllachora effusa 
Phyllachora egenula 
Phyllachora ehrenbergii 
Phyllachora ehretiae 
Phyllachora ehrhartae 
Phyllachora ekmaniana 
Phyllachora elaeocarpi 
Phyllachora elegans 
Phyllachora elettariae 
Phyllachora eleusines 
Phyllachora elionuri 
Phyllachora elliptica 
Phyllachora elmeri 
Phyllachora emarginata 
Phyllachora embeliae 
Phyllachora endiandrae 
Phyllachora engelhardiae 
Phyllachora epicladii 
Phyllachora episphaeria 
Phyllachora eriochloae 
Phyllachora ermidensis 
Phyllachora erythroxylina 
Phyllachora escalloniae 
Phyllachora espeletiae 
Phyllachora eugeniae 
Phyllachora eupatorii 
Phyllachora euphorbiaceae 
Phyllachora euryae 
Phyllachora evernia 
Phyllachora exanthematica 
Phyllachora exasperans 
Phyllachora eximia 
Phyllachora exostemae 
Phyllachora explanata

F

Phyllachora fallax 
Phyllachora fatiscens 
Phyllachora feijoae 
Phyllachora fici-albae 
Phyllachora fici-asperrimae 
Phyllachora ficicola 
Phyllachora fici-dekdekenae 
Phyllachora fici-fulvae 
Phyllachora fici-gibbosae 
Phyllachora fici-heterophyllae 
Phyllachora fici-hispidae 
Phyllachora fici-hochstetteri 
Phyllachora fici-minahassae 
Phyllachora fici-obscurae 
Phyllachora fici-orbispora 
Phyllachora fici-variolosae 
Phyllachora fici-wightianae 
Phyllachora ficuum 
Phyllachora filicina 
Phyllachora filicum 
Phyllachora fimbristylidicola 
Phyllachora fimbristylidis 
Phyllachora flabella 
Phyllachora flavocincta 
Phyllachora flemingiae 
Phyllachora fluminensis 
Phyllachora forsteroniae 
Phyllachora fraseriana 
Phyllachora freycinetiae 
Phyllachora frigoris 
Phyllachora fructicola 
Phyllachora fructigena 
Phyllachora furnasensis 
Phyllachora fuscescens 
Phyllachora fusicarpa 
Phyllachora fusispora

G

Phyllachora gaylussaciae 
Phyllachora genipae 
Phyllachora gentianae 
Phyllachora gentilis 
Phyllachora glaziovii 
Phyllachora globispora 
Phyllachora glochidii 
Phyllachora glochidiicola 
Phyllachora gloriana 
Phyllachora glycinicola 
Phyllachora glycosmidis 
Phyllachora goeppertiae 
Phyllachora gomphandrae 
Phyllachora gondarensis 
Phyllachora gorakhpurensis 
Phyllachora gordoniae 
Phyllachora gouaniae 
Phyllachora gouaniae 
Phyllachora goyazensis 
Phyllachora gracillima 
Phyllachora graminis 
Phyllachora grammica 
Phyllachora granulosa 
Phyllachora gratissimae 
Phyllachora greciana 
Phyllachora grevilleae 
Phyllachora grewiae 
Phyllachora guaduae 
Phyllachora guanacastica 
Phyllachora guatteriae 
Phyllachora guavira 
Phyllachora guazumae 
Phyllachora gudalurensis 
Phyllachora gymnemae 
Phyllachora gyneriicola 
Phyllachora gynoxidis

H

Phyllachora hainanensis 
Phyllachora hakeicola 
Phyllachora hauturu 
Phyllachora heimii 
Phyllachora helvetica 
Phyllachora hendrickxii 
Phyllachora henningsii 
Phyllachora heraclei 
Phyllachora heterocladae 
Phyllachora heteropteridis 
Phyllachora heterotrichi 
Phyllachora hibisci 
Phyllachora hibiscicola 
Phyllachora himalayana 
Phyllachora howardiana 
Phyllachora hoyosensis 
Phyllachora huallagensis 
Phyllachora huberi 
Phyllachora hugoniae 
Phyllachora huigraensis 
Phyllachora hyssopi

I

Phyllachora icacoreae 
Phyllachora idahoensis 
Phyllachora impatientis 
Phyllachora incarcerata 
Phyllachora inclusa 
Phyllachora inconspicua 
Phyllachora incrustans 
Phyllachora indica 
Phyllachora inelegans 
Phyllachora infectoria 
Phyllachora infesta 
Phyllachora infuscans 
Phyllachora ingicola 
Phyllachora inimica 
Phyllachora interstitialis 
Phyllachora ipirangae 
Phyllachora irregularis 
Phyllachora isachnicola 
Phyllachora ischaemi 
Phyllachora isonandrae 
Phyllachora ixorae

J

Phyllachora jacarandae 
Phyllachora japonica 
Phyllachora javanica 
Phyllachora jianfengensis 
Phyllachora juglandicola 
Phyllachora julocrotonis 
Phyllachora junci 
Phyllachora juruensis

K

Phyllachora kaernbachii 
Phyllachora kamalii Seshadri 
Phyllachora kambakkamensis 
Phyllachora kanarensis 
Phyllachora kanyakumariana 
Phyllachora karwarensis 
Phyllachora kellermanii 
Phyllachora keralensis 
Phyllachora kerniana 
Phyllachora klotzschiani 
Phyllachora kniphofiae 
Phyllachora koondrookensis 
Phyllachora kwangtungensis 
Phyllachora kylei 
Phyllachora kyllingae

L

Phyllachora lacrimiformis 
Phyllachora lactea 
Phyllachora laeviuscula 
Phyllachora lagerheimiana 
Phyllachora lagunensis 
Phyllachora lamprothea 
Phyllachora lapponica 
Phyllachora lasiacis 
Phyllachora lauracearum 
Phyllachora lauricola 
Phyllachora laurinearum 
Phyllachora leeae-elatae 
Phyllachora leeicola 
Phyllachora leersiae 
Phyllachora lehmanniana 
Phyllachora leopoldensis 
Phyllachora lepida 
Phyllachora leptasca 
Phyllachora leptocarydii 
Phyllachora leptochloae 
Phyllachora leptoderridis 
Phyllachora leptospermi 
Phyllachora leptostromoidea 
Phyllachora leptotheca 
Phyllachora lespedezae 
Phyllachora leucospila 
Phyllachora leveilleana 
Phyllachora liebenbergii 
Phyllachora lindmanii 
Phyllachora lineola 
Phyllachora liniae 
Phyllachora litseae 
Phyllachora litseicola 
Phyllachora lonchotheca 
Phyllachora longinaviculata 
Phyllachora loudetiae 
Phyllachora lucida 
Phyllachora lundiae 
Phyllachora lunulata 
Phyllachora luteomaculata 
Phyllachora luzulae 
Phyllachora lyonsiae

M

Phyllachora mabae 
Phyllachora mabeicola 
Phyllachora macarangae 
Phyllachora machaeriicola 
Phyllachora macroloculata 
Phyllachora macrospora 
Phyllachora maculans 
Phyllachora maculans 
Phyllachora macularum 
Phyllachora maculata 
Phyllachora maculicola 
Phyllachora madeirensis 
Phyllachora madhucae 
Phyllachora magnificens 
Phyllachora malabarensis 
Phyllachora malloti 
Phyllachora malloticola 
Phyllachora malvavisci 
Phyllachora manaosensis 
Phyllachora manuka 
Phyllachora maprouneae 
Phyllachora maquilingensis 
Phyllachora marginalis 
Phyllachora massinii 
Phyllachora mauriae 
Phyllachora maydis 
Phyllachora mayepeae 
Phyllachora mayorii 
Phyllachora medellinensis 
Phyllachora megalospora 
Phyllachora megastroma 
Phyllachora meibomiae 
Phyllachora melaleucae 
Phyllachora melanoplaca 
Phyllachora melaspilea 
Phyllachora melastomacearum 
Phyllachora melastomatis 
Phyllachora melastomatis-candidae 
Phyllachora melatephra 
Phyllachora meliae 
Phyllachora melianthi 
Phyllachora melicicola 
Phyllachora meliosmae 
Phyllachora menispermi 
Phyllachora menothea 
Phyllachora meridensis 
Phyllachora merrillii 
Phyllachora metastelmae 
Phyllachora michelii 
Phyllachora miconiicola 
Phyllachora miconiiphila 
Phyllachora microcenta 
Phyllachora microchita 
Phyllachora micropeltoidea 
Phyllachora microsperma 
Phyllachora microspora 
Phyllachora microstegia 
Phyllachora microstroma 
Phyllachora microtheles 
Phyllachora millettiae 
Phyllachora mindoensis 
Phyllachora minuta 
Phyllachora minutissima 
Phyllachora mirandina 
Phyllachora miryensis 
Phyllachora miscanthi 
Phyllachora miscanthidii 
Phyllachora missouriensis 
Phyllachora monanthochloes 
Phyllachora monensis 
Phyllachora monninae 
Phyllachora montserratis 
Phyllachora mouriri 
Phyllachora muhlenbergiae 
Phyllachora mulleri 
Phyllachora musae 
Phyllachora musicola 
Phyllachora mutisiae 
Phyllachora myrciae-rostratae 
Phyllachora myrrhinii 
Phyllachora myrsinicola 
Phyllachora myrtincola 
Phyllachora mysorensis

N

Phyllachora naqsii 
Phyllachora nectandrae 
Phyllachora nectandricola 
Phyllachora negeriana 
Phyllachora neolitseae 
Phyllachora nepenthidis 
Phyllachora nervicida 
Phyllachora nervisequens 
Phyllachora neurophila 
Phyllachora nidulans 
Phyllachora nigerrima 
Phyllachora nigrescens 
Phyllachora nitens 
Phyllachora nitidissima 
Phyllachora njalensis 
Phyllachora noackii 
Phyllachora noblei 
Phyllachora nodicola 
Phyllachora notabilis 
Phyllachora novoguineensis 
Phyllachora nuttalliana

O

Phyllachora oblongispora 
Phyllachora oblongospora 
Phyllachora occultans 
Phyllachora ochnacearum 
Phyllachora ochnae 
Phyllachora ocoteae 
Phyllachora ocoteicola 
Phyllachora olivascens 
Phyllachora olyrae 
Phyllachora opaca 
Phyllachora opiferae 
Phyllachora opposita 
Phyllachora orbicula 
Phyllachora orbicularis 
Phyllachora orbiculata 
Phyllachora orbis 
Phyllachora oreodaphnes 
Phyllachora ornans 
Phyllachora oryzopsidis 
Phyllachora ospinae 
Phyllachora oxyspora 
Phyllachora oyedaeae

P

Phyllachora paludicola 
Phyllachora panamensis 
Phyllachora panici 
Phyllachora panicicola 
Phyllachora pappiana 
Phyllachora paraguaya 
Phyllachora paralabatiae 
Phyllachora paramo-nigra 
Phyllachora parberyi 
Phyllachora parvicapsa 
Phyllachora parvula 
Phyllachora paspalicola 
Phyllachora paulliniae 
Phyllachora peglerae 
Phyllachora peltaticola 
Phyllachora penicillata 
Phyllachora pennellii 
Phyllachora pennisetina 
Phyllachora peregrina 
Phyllachora perforans 
Phyllachora perisporioides 
Phyllachora perlata 
Phyllachora permeans 
Phyllachora permixta 
Phyllachora permutata 
Phyllachora pernettyae 
Phyllachora perotidis 
Phyllachora perplexans 
Phyllachora perseae 
Phyllachora perversa 
Phyllachora pestis-nigra 
Phyllachora petitmenginii 
Phyllachora phanerae 
Phyllachora phlogis 
Phyllachora phoebes 
Phyllachora phoebicola 
Phyllachora phyllanthophila 
Phyllachora phylloplaca 
Phyllachora phyllostachydis 
Phyllachora physocarpi 
Phyllachora phytolaccae 
Phyllachora picea 
Phyllachora picramniae 
Phyllachora piperacearum 
Phyllachora pipericola 
Phyllachora piptadeniicola 
Phyllachora piptocarphae 
Phyllachora pittieri 
Phyllachora pittospori 
Phyllachora placida 
Phyllachora plantaginis 
Phyllachora platyelliptica 
Phyllachora pogonatheri 
Phyllachora polemonii 
Phyllachora polygalae 
Phyllachora polygonati 
Phyllachora polypogonis 
Phyllachora polytocae 
Phyllachora poonensis 
Phyllachora populi 
Phyllachora portoricensis 
Phyllachora potentillae 
Phyllachora pouteriae 
Phyllachora prataprajii 
Phyllachora premnae 
Phyllachora pressa 
Phyllachora pretoriae 
Phyllachora pseudes 
Phyllachora pseudostromatica 
Phyllachora psychotriae 
Phyllachora pterocarpi 
Phyllachora pterolobii 
Phyllachora pterospermi 
Phyllachora pulchra 
Phyllachora puncta 
Phyllachora punctifaciens 
Phyllachora punctiformis 
Phyllachora pusilla 
Phyllachora pycrei 
Phyllachora pygei

Q

Phyllachora quadrospora 
Phyllachora qualeae 

Phyllachora queenslandica 
Phyllachora quercus

R

Phyllachora ramamurthyi 
Phyllachora ramicola 
Phyllachora ramonensis 
Phyllachora ramosa 
Phyllachora ramosii 
Phyllachora randiae 
Phyllachora rapaneicola 
Phyllachora ravenalae 
Phyllachora reducta 
Phyllachora renealmiae 
Phyllachora repens 
Phyllachora reticulata 
Phyllachora rhamni 
Phyllachora rhois 
Phyllachora rhopographoides 
Phyllachora rhynchosporae 
Phyllachora rhytismoides 
Phyllachora rickiana 
Phyllachora rickseckeri 
Phyllachora rimulosa 
Phyllachora rostellispora 
Phyllachora rostkoviae 
Phyllachora roupalae 
Phyllachora roupalina 
Phyllachora roureae 
Phyllachora rouxii 
Phyllachora rubefaciens 
Phyllachora rubiginosae 
Phyllachora rudgeae 
Phyllachora ruizii 
Phyllachora ruprechtiae

S

Phyllachora saccardoana 
Phyllachora sacchari 
Phyllachora sacchari-spontanei 
Phyllachora sageretiae 
Phyllachora sagreana 
Phyllachora salaciae 
Phyllachora samanensis 
Phyllachora sancta 
Phyllachora sarcomphali 
Phyllachora sasae 
Phyllachora sassafras 
Phyllachora scabies 
Phyllachora scanica 
Phyllachora scapincola 
Phyllachora schimae 
Phyllachora schizolobiicola 
Phyllachora schoenicola 
Phyllachora schotiae 
Phyllachora schweinfurthii 
Phyllachora scirpi 
Phyllachora scleriae 
Phyllachora scleriicola 
Phyllachora secunda 
Phyllachora securidacae 
Phyllachora selenospora 
Phyllachora sesseae 
Phyllachora setariicola 
Phyllachora shettyi 
Phyllachora shiraiana 
Phyllachora shivasii 
Phyllachora sideroxyli 
Phyllachora sikkimensis 
Phyllachora silphii 
Phyllachora simabae-cedronis 
Phyllachora simabicola 
Phyllachora simplex 
Phyllachora sinensis 
Phyllachora sinik-lagaraik 
Phyllachora sintenisii 
Phyllachora smilacicola 
Phyllachora smilacis 
Phyllachora socia 
Phyllachora solidaginum 
Phyllachora sordida 
Phyllachora sororcula 
Phyllachora spatholobi 
Phyllachora spegazzinii 
Phyllachora sphaerocaryi 
Phyllachora sphaerosperma 
Phyllachora sphaerospora 
Phyllachora spissa 
Phyllachora sporoboli 
Phyllachora stearnii 
Phyllachora stena 
Phyllachora stenocarpa 
Phyllachora stenospora 
Phyllachora stephaniae 
Phyllachora stevensii 
Phyllachora stewartii 
Phyllachora stigmodes 
Phyllachora stipata 
Phyllachora strelitziae 
Phyllachora subbrachyspora 
Phyllachora subcuticularis 
Phyllachora subopaca 
Phyllachora subtropica 
Phyllachora swartziae 
Phyllachora swieteniae 
Phyllachora sycomori 
Phyllachora sydowii 
Phyllachora sylvatica

T

Phyllachora tabebuiae 
Phyllachora tabernaemontanae 
Phyllachora tachirensis 
Phyllachora tamoyae 
Phyllachora tandonii 
Phyllachora tanensis 
Phyllachora tapirirae 
Phyllachora taruma 
Phyllachora tecleae 
Phyllachora tehonis 
Phyllachora teneriffae 
Phyllachora tengchongensis 
Phyllachora tenuis 
Phyllachora tephrosiae 
Phyllachora terminaliae 
Phyllachora tessariae 
Phyllachora tetrantherae 
Phyllachora tetrasperma 
Phyllachora tetraspora 
Phyllachora thanatophora 
Phyllachora themedae 
Phyllachora therophila 
Phyllachora thiruvananthapurica 
Phyllachora thwaitesii 
Phyllachora thysanolaenae 
Phyllachora tijucensis 
Phyllachora tiliae 
Phyllachora tipae 
Phyllachora tirolensis 
Phyllachora tjangkorreh 
Phyllachora tjapukaiensis 
Phyllachora tonduzii 
Phyllachora tonkinensis 
Phyllachora toroi 
Phyllachora torrubiae 
Phyllachora tragiae 
Phyllachora travancorica 
Phyllachora tricholaenae 
Phyllachora tricuspidis 
Phyllachora tripsacina 
Phyllachora tritici-gracilis 
Phyllachora triumfettae 
Phyllachora trivialis 
Phyllachora trophis 
Phyllachora tropicalis 
Phyllachora trujillensis 
Phyllachora truncatispora 
Phyllachora tumatumariana 
Phyllachora tupi

U

Phyllachora uberata 
Phyllachora ugandensis 
Phyllachora ulcerata 
Phyllachora umbilicata 
Phyllachora uppalii 
Phyllachora urbaniana 
Phyllachora urophylla 
Phyllachora urvilleana 
Phyllachora usteriana 
Phyllachora ustulata

V

Phyllachora vallecaucana 
Phyllachora valsiformis 
Phyllachora valsispora 
Phyllachora velatispora 
Phyllachora ventilaginis 
Phyllachora veraguensis 
Phyllachora verbesinae 
Phyllachora vernicosa 
Phyllachora vernoniae 
Phyllachora vernoniicola 
Phyllachora verrucosa 
Phyllachora vesicata 
Phyllachora vetiveriicola 
Phyllachora victoriensis 
Phyllachora viequesensis 
Phyllachora vilis 
Phyllachora vinosa 
Phyllachora viridulocincta 
Phyllachora vismiae 
Phyllachora viticicola 
Phyllachora viticola 
Phyllachora vitis 
Phyllachora viventis 
Phyllachora vochysiae 
Phyllachora vossiae 
Phyllachora vulgata

W

Phyllachora weirii 
Phyllachora whetzelii 
Phyllachora wightianae 
Phyllachora winteri 
Phyllachora wismarensis 
Phyllachora woodiana 
Phyllachora wrightiana

X Y Z

Phyllachora xanthii 
Phyllachora xylopiae 
Phyllachora xylosmatis 
Phyllachora xylostei 
Phyllachora yapensis 
Phyllachora yassensis 
Phyllachora yatesii 
Phyllachora yunnanensis 
Phyllachora zanthoxyli 
Phyllachora zygopetali

References

External links

Phyllachora